St Mary's Church, Lead, is a redundant Anglican chapel standing in an isolated position in fields some  to the west of the village of Saxton, North Yorkshire, England. Though technically a chapel, it is generally referred to as a church.  It is managed by The Churches Conservation Trust, and is recorded in the National Heritage List for England as a designated Grade II* listed building.  The chapel stands close to the site of the battle of Towton of 1461, which was part of the Wars of the Roses.  In the 1930s it was saved from neglect by a local group of ramblers, and is known locally as the Ramblers' Church.

History

The chapel dates from the 14th century and was probably the chapel for a medieval manor house which no longer exists. It is thought that it was built for the Tyas family. Additions were made to the chapel in the 18th century. In the late 19th and early 20th centuries repairs to the chapel were carried out, and in 1912 it was incorporated into the parish of Saxton; before this time it had been a chapelry. However, by 1931 it had fallen into ruin, but it was saved by a group of local ramblers. Repairs were carried out, the 18th-century communion rails were removed, the three-decker pulpit was moved into the northeast corner of the chapel, a stone altar was built, and the medieval altar slab was laid on its top. It is thought that the font was also moved at this time. On 6 November 1932 the chapel was re-dedicated. Further restoration work was carried out in 1934. Due to the decline of the local population later in the 20th century, the chapel was declared redundant, and it came under the care of the Churches Conservation Trust in 1980. It is now maintained privately.

Architecture

Its interior is very simple, containing benches dating possibly from the medieval period. On the east wall of the chapel are boards containing sentences from the Holy Communion service dating from the 18th century. Also in the chapel are a three-decker pulpit, a stone altar, and a font.

Friends of Lead Church
St Mary's is maintained by a group called the Friends of Lead Church and there is an annual service.

See also

List of churches preserved by the Churches Conservation Trust in Northern England

Further reading
Church of St Mary, Lead, North Yorkshire (2011) The Churches Conservation Trust (London)

References

14th-century church buildings in England
Grade II* listed churches in North Yorkshire
Churches preserved by the Churches Conservation Trust
Redundant churches